8U  or 8-U may refer to:

8U, IATA code for Afriqiyah Airways
One of the possible sizes of a rack unit
F8U, a model of  Vought F-8 Crusader
RG-8U, a type of coaxial cable
HP 8U, Roman-8 character set by Hewlett-Packard

See also
U8 (disambiguation)